Procambarus pallidus, the pallid cave crayfish, is a freshwater crayfish native to over 80 caves in Florida and Georgia in the United States.

References

Cambaridae
Cave crayfish
Freshwater crustaceans of North America
Crustaceans described in 1940
Taxa named by Horton H. Hobbs Jr.